Eustaquio Méndez is a province in the north-western parts of the Bolivian department of Tarija.

Location
Eustaquio Méndez province is one of six provinces in the Tarija Department. It is located between 20° 57' and 21° 36' south and between 64° 23' and 65° 15' west.

The province borders Chuquisaca Department in the north and west, José María Avilés Province in the south, Cercado Province in the south-east, and Burnet O'Connor Province in the east.

The province extends over 90 km from north to south, and 105 km from east to west.

Population
The principal language of the province is Spanish, spoken by 99.7% and 0.4% Guaraní.

The population increased from 29,868 inhabitants (1992 census) to 32,038 (2001 census), an increase of 7.3%. - 46.9% of the population are younger than 15 years old.

78.1% of the population have no access to electricity, 77.8% have no sanitary facilities (1992).

67.8% of the population are employed in agriculture, 0.1% in mining, 5.9% in industry, 26.2% in general services (2001).

95.1% of the population are Catholics, 3.1% are Protestants (1992).

Division
The province comprises two municipalities:
El Puente Municipality
San Lorenzo Municipality

Places of interest 
 Cordillera de Sama Biological Reserve

External links
General map of province
Detailed map of province towns and rivers
Population data (Spanish)

Provinces of Tarija Department